Motu Vananui is a  island in the Bora Bora Islands Group, within the Society Islands of French Polynesia. It is the located between Paahi, and Mouti.

The island is the site of the small "Le Pension Paradis".

The nearest airport is Bora Bora Airport.

Administration
The island is part of Bora Bora Commune.
Its current population includes the family operating the hotel.

References